Wanderlust is the debut studio album by Canadian atmospheric black metal band Finnr's Cane. It was released in 2010 by Frostscald Records and re-released in 2011 by Prophecy Productions. The re-release includes a demo version of the song Snowfall, one of the first tracks composed by the band.

The album was recorded by The Bard at Sardonic Moon Studio in Sudbury, Ontario, Canada. Wanderlust has been compared to the music of Agalloch, Wolves in the Throne Room, and early Ulver, while maintaining a sound unique to Finnr's Cane.

Track listing

Personnel 
The Peasant – Drums
The Slave – Cello, synth
The Bard – Guitar, vocals

2011 re-release:
Benjamin König – cover art and layout
Jeremey Swanson – photography
Trey Corikern – photography

References 

2010 debut albums
Finnr's Cane albums